Jack Gerke,  (7 June 1916 – 14 February 2005) was an officer in the Australian Army, serving in the Second World War and Korean War.

Biography
Gerke was born in Claremont, Western Australia on 7 June 1916. During the Second World War he enlisted in the Second Australian Imperial Force (2nd AIF) on 6 August 1940. An assistant moulder before the war, he was appointed as a lieutenant in 1941 and served in the 2/16th Battalion and the 26th Battalion. Placed into the Reserve of Officers in 1947, he was promoted to captain in 1950 and served in the 3rd Battalion, Royal Australian Regiment (3 RAR) during the Korean War in 1951–52. He was awarded the Distinguished Service Order for bravery and leadership during the Battle of Maryang San in July 1951. From 1952 to 1954 he served as officer commanding No. 1 Reinforcement Holding Unit. Reaching  the rank of major, he resigned from the Army in 1954. In 1976 he was appointed a Member of the Order of Australia for service to veterans. Gerke died on 14 February 2005 at the age of 88.

Notes

References

External links
"Comments By Jack Gerke in New Guinea Action"
"Korean War Service Record"
"Battle of Maryang San"

1916 births
2005 deaths
Australian Army officers
Australian military personnel of the Korean War
Australian Army personnel of World War II
Companions of the Distinguished Service Order
Members of the Order of Australia
People from Perth, Western Australia